
Year 576 (DLXXVI) was a leap year starting on Wednesday (link will display the full calendar) of the Julian calendar. The denomination 576 for this year has been used since the early medieval period, when the Anno Domini calendar era became the prevalent method in Europe for naming years.

Events 
 By place 

 Byzantine Empire 
 Byzantine–Sassanid War: A Persian army under King Khosrau I breaks through the Caucasus into Anatolia (modern Turkey). They attack the cities of Theodosiopolis and Caesarea, but are thwarted. Khosrau is forced to retreat and sacks Sebasteia. On the way home, he is intercepted by a Byzantine force under Justinian (magister militum of the East), and severely defeated near Melitene. The royal baggage is captured, and many Persians drown, while escaping across the Euphrates.

 Europe 
 Baduarius, son-in-law of the Byzantine emperor Justin II, is sent to Italy to resist the Lombard conquest. He leads an aborted counter-assault against the Lombards and dies soon after.
 The Visigoths under King Liuvigild establish the capital of their kingdom in Toledo, located in central Spain (approximate date).

 Asia 
 The Göktürks under Tardu cross the Cimmerian Bosporus into the Crimea, and besiege the city of Panticapaeum (Ukraine).
 Jinji becomes king of the Korean kingdom of Silla.

Births 
 Abu Ayyub al-Ansari, friend of Muhammad (approximate date)
 Gao Shilian, chancellor of the Tang Dynasty (d. 647)

Deaths 
 May 28 – Saint Germain, bishop of Paris
 Baduarius, Byzantine aristocrat (approximate date)

References